Laura Drasbæk (born 22 December 1974) is a Danish actress. She has appeared in more than thirty films since 1990.

Selected filmography

References

External links
 

1974 births
Living people
Actresses from Copenhagen
Danish film actresses
Danish television actresses
20th-century Danish actresses
21st-century Danish actresses